Chanakya is a 2005 Indian Tamil-language comedy drama film directed by A. Venkatesh and produced by Vishwas Sundar. It stars R. Sarathkumar, Namitha, Laya and Vadivelu. The music was composed by Srikanth Deva with cinematography by Madhu Ambat and editing by V. T. Vijayan. The film released on 23 September 2005 to average reviews and became average at box office. It is the Sarath Kumar's hundredth film.

Plot
Ganesh is an auto driver and kind-hearted man who goes out of his way to earn money to help the poor and the needy. He likes to be in the limelight. Knowing well that the media would sensationalize anything that has to do with popular people in the city, he kidnaps a businessman, and in another instance, he implicates and submits himself to the police for a murder of an MLA that he does not commit. While he draws maximum publicity in the media, he creates a miserable life for the police. By his repeated pranks, Ganesh establishes himself as a person crazy only for publicity. People begin to call him "Publicity" Ganesh.

Devanayaki owns a restaurant, and several autos run in her name in the local area. She is head over heels in love with Ganesh and goes about wooing him. In most of her screen time, she is singing and dancing with Ganesh. Meanwhile, Anjali approaches Ganesh to act in her ad films in return for handsome money, but she is actually an undercover agent investigating Ganesh's past.

Ganesh has a sorrow past. His past life and the reason for his current deeds are told in a flashback. Ganesh's father is an upright person who works as a clerk in a collectorate in a coastal village. A natural disaster strikes that area, and leaves many homeless in its wake. To ameliorate their problems, the government allocates Rs. 20 crore to help the affected people rehabilitate. Unfortunately, the local assistant collector, the local MLA, and the local SP together form a trio and forget the grant, even while pretending to protect the best interest of the people. Ganesh's father learns of the trio's involvement in the heist and vows to expose them to the public, but the "representatives of authority" frame false charges and deceitfully turn the public outrage against Ganesh's father. In a melee, Ganesh's family is burnt alive. Ganesh escapes to the city, and avenges the death of his family.

Ganesh then orchestrates the killing of the shenanigans.

Cast

R. Sarathkumar as "Publicity" Ganesh and his father Manikkam (dual role)
Namitha as Deivanayaki
Laya as Anjali
Vadivelu as Subramani
Seetha as Kalyani
Salim Ghouse as Police commissioner
Cochin Hanifa as MLA 
Vincent Asokan as Assistant Collector
Ilavarasu as Police inspector
Meera Krishnan as commissioner's wife
Mahanadi Shankar as Politician
LIC Narasimhan as Judge
Singamuthu as Fight Master 
Halwa Vasu as Vasu
Mayilsamy as Subramani's customer
Bonda Mani as Subramani's customer

Soundtrack
Soundtrack was composed by Srikanth Deva.

Critical reception
Indiaglitz wrote "Though it is a beaten to blue theme, the rapid narration by Venkatesh makes the movie engrossing". Sify wrote "For those seeking masala entertainment, Chanakya is worth the price of ticket money".

References

External links
 

2005 films
2000s Tamil-language films
2000s masala films
Films scored by Srikanth Deva
Films directed by A. Venkatesh (director)
2005 comedy-drama films